Cuyahoga County, Ohio, United States is divided into 21 townships.

When Cuyahoga County was founded, it was divided into civil townships for purposes of rural government, as were other Ohio counties. By 1990, this county was the most urbanized county in Ohio, and as a result, most of its townships have been annexed by the city of Cleveland or one of the other municipalities in Cuyahoga County. In Ohio, when the entirety of a civil township has been annexed by one or more municipalities, it ceases to have governmental powers and becomes a paper township, existing on maps, but possessing no governmental powers.

Bedford Township
Although the land that became Bedford Township was bought by the Connecticut Land Company in 1795, no white settlers came until Elijah Nobles arrived in 1813, and the first permanent settler came only in 1821.  The township was organized on April 7, 1823, and the city of Bedford was incorporated as a village on March 15, 1837.  Throughout the rest of the century, the township remained an agricultural area with little industry, but major industries began to arrive in the early 20th century.

In 1915, the first political change occurred in the township since 1837, when Maple Heights was incorporated as a village.  The rest of the township remained unincorporated until 1951, when it was divided between Bedford Heights, Oakwood, and Walton Hills.  As of the 2000 census, these cities and villages had a total population of 57,812.

Brecksville Township
Brecksville Township was formed in 1807 and named for Massachusetts resident John Breck, the owner of significant lands in that vicinity.  It included the modern community of Brecksville and part of Broadview Heights.  The township was first settled in 1811 by the family of one Seth Payne, who came from Williamsburg, Massachusetts, and who was soon followed by several other families.  Its first school was founded in 1814, with its first teacher being one of Payne's daughters.  Within the township, the village of Brecksville was incorporated in 1921, and it gained the status of city in 1960.

Brooklyn Township
Brooklyn Township was organized on June 1, 1818.  In its early years, it extended northward to Lake Erie, but most of the township incorporated into or was annexed by municipalities, the last of which was the city of Brooklyn in the southwest.  Today, the township is divided between the cities of Brooklyn and Cleveland] and the villages of Brooklyn Heights, Cuyahoga Heights, Linndale, and Newburgh Heights.

Dover Township
In 1806, two residents of Dover, Connecticut purchased the northwestern corner township of Cuyahoga County and named it for their hometown.  Although Europeans had visited the area before 1800, the first settlers did not arrive until 1810, a family from Vermont and a family from New York.  The population grew rapidly; as early as the 1840 census, the township had a population of 960 people.

In the summer of 1901, the northern part of the township broke away and soon formed the village of Bay, which became Bay Village in 1950.  Meanwhile, the village of Dover had been incorporated to the south of Bay in 1911.  It, too, changed its name, in 1940, to Westlake.  Today, most of the original Dover Township is divided between Bay Village and Westlake, although its southeastern portion has been part of North Olmsted since that village was incorporated in 1908.

East Cleveland Township
East Cleveland Township was organized in 1847.  Part of the township incorporated as the village (now city) of East Cleveland in 1895.  The Cleveland neighborhood of Central, located in East Cleveland Township, was originally a heavily farmed area, although it became industrialized after the Civil War.  At one time, this part of East Cleveland Township was the most heavily populated neighborhood in Cleveland.  Today, the township is divided between the village of Bratenahl and the cities of Cleveland, Cleveland Heights, Euclid, and East Cleveland.

Euclid Township
Euclid Township, named for the ancient Greek mathematician, was formed in 1809 after being surveyed by a team sent out by Moses Cleaveland.  The first settler was likely David Dille, who built a house along Euclid Creek, and he was followed by William Coleman in 1804.  In its early years, some people thought that Euclid might become more important than Cleveland, but Cleveland became dominant after 1827, when the Ohio and Erie Canal was opened.  At this time, the economy of Euclid Township was based on farming, although it included saltworks and sawmills, and in later years, quarries became more important.  The village of Euclid was incorporated in 1877, unincorporated in 1878, reincorporated in 1903, and became a city in 1930.  Euclid Township became a paper township in 1917.  Today, its land is divided between the cities of Cleveland, Cleveland Heights, East Cleveland, Euclid, Lyndhurst, Richmond Heights, and South Euclid.

Independence Township
Independence Township's earliest history was destroyed by a fire.  In its early years, the township was primarily agricultural, but by 1850, it possessed nationally recognized quarries.  The city of Independence incorporated much of Independence Township as a village in 1914, and the rest of the township was incorporated as the village of Seven Hills in 1927.  Today, Independence Township is divided between Brooklyn Heights, Cuyahoga Heights, Garfield Heights, Independence, Seven Hills, and Valley View.

Mayfield Township
Mayfield Township was organized in 1819, being split off from Chagrin Township.  It existed until 1920, when the entire township was incorporated into several villages: Gates Mills, Highland Heights, Mayfield Village, and Riverside.  Since then, these municipalities have changed: Mayfield Heights left Mayfield Village in 1925, Riverside joined Gates Mills in the late 1920s, and Lyndhurst annexed a small portion of the township.

Middleburg Township
Middleburg Township, named for Middleburg, New York, was first settled in the summer of 1809.  For several decades, few people lived in the area, which was covered with swamps and heavy forests.  Significant development began in 1842, when the first quarry was developed in the southwestern part of the township.  After 1850, when Berea was incorporated in the southwestern part of the township, the rest of the township was improved so as to make it more appealing to settlement, and a few industries were founded.  The township was further reduced by the incorporation of Brook Park in 1914, and the remaining unincorporated areas were incorporated as Middleburg Heights in 1927.  Today, the township is divided between four different cities:
Most of Berea, in the southwest
Most of Brook Park, in the northeast
A small corner of Cleveland, in the northwest
All of Middleburg Heights, in the southeast

Newburgh Township
Newburgh Township was organized on 15 October 1814, some years after the settlement of Newburgh had been established.  Originally, the area's natural resources were significant enough that Newburg was the leading settlement in Cuyahoga County, causing Cleveland to be referred to as "the town on the lake, six miles from Newburgh," although Cleveland's location on Lake Erie soon led to its dominance.  Cleveland first annexed part of Newburgh Township in 1867 and continued to expand through the next several decades, eventually absorbing the village of Newburgh and most of the rest of the township by 1905.  The village of Newburgh Heights was incorporated in 1904, although it has since been reduced in area significantly.  Today, Newburg Township is divided between four cities and three villages: Brooklyn Heights, Cleveland, Cleveland Heights, Cuyahoga Heights, Garfield Heights, Newburgh Heights, and Shaker Heights.

Orange Township
Orange Township was formed in 1820.  It included the modern communities of Beachwood, Hunting Valley, Moreland Hills, Orange, Pepper Pike, and Woodmere, plus part of Chagrin Falls Township. The first settler was Serenus Burnett, who arrived in 1815. It was named after Orange, Connecticut, the hometown of several early settlers.

Parma Township
Parma Township, named for Parma, New York, was organized in 1826, 10 years after the first settlers arrived from New York.  The township was long a farming region, with its only industry being a clockmaker's shop.  In 1911, part of the western region of the township was incorporated as Parma Heights, and the rest was incorporated as Parma in 1924.  In 2000, what was once Parma Township had a population of 107,314.

Riveredge Township
Riveredge Township was organized in 1926 by residents of Brook Park, who disagreed with the village's course and seceded.  It was always a very small township; even after expansion in 1932, it had an area of only 48 acres (19 ha).  The township changed over the years; it was originally primarily a truck farm, became a trailer park in the 1950s, and expanded greatly in the 1960s.  However, the township was purchased in 1983 by Cleveland Hopkins International Airport, and it has been virtually uninhabited since 1986.  Riveredge Township was officially dissolved on July 1, 1992, when it was divided by the cities of Cleveland] and Fairview Park.

The township is now divided between Brookpark, Fairview Park, and Cleveland.

Rockport Township
Located on the shoreline of Lake Erie, Rockport Township was organized on February 24, 1819.  In its early years, many farms covered the township.  Today, the township's original area is divided between several municipalities: Cleveland, a small portion of Brook Park, Fairview Park, Lakewood (incorporated as a village on August 31, 1889), Linndale, and Rocky River.

Royalton Township
Royalton Township was formed on October 27, 1818, seven years after the first settlers arrived in the area.  It was named after Royalton, Vermont, the hometown of two of the township's earliest settlers.  Only one village was incorporated in the township, Royalton Center.  For some time, the township was an important center of agriculture, especially dairying.  To avoid confusion with another Royalton Township in northwest Ohio and another Royalton village in southeastern Ohio, its name was changed to North Royalton Township in 1881.  The township ceased to exist in April 1927, when it incorporated into the village of North Royalton. The township is now divided between most of North Royalton and the western half of Broadview Heights.

Solon Township
Solon Township was named for Isaac Solon Bull, the son of one of the first settlers.  The township was first settled in 1820, although development was retarded by the swampland common in the area. By 1850, the swamps had been drained, leaving rich farmland.  The village of Solon was incorporated in 1917 and became a city in 1961, while Glenwillow was first settled in 1893.  Today, the entire township is occupied by one of these two municipalities, and in 2000, it had a population of 22,697.

Strongsville Township
Strongsville Township was organized in 1818 and named for John Strong, an early pioneer who came from Vermont.  By 1820, the township had a population of 297.  Agriculture was long the mainstay of the township's economy, although sawmills, a quarry, and a plant for manufacturing bricks were opened in the early years.  Except for a small part that was annexed by Berea, the township was eventually entirely incorporated into Strongsville, which was incorporated in 1927 and became a city in 1960.  In 2000, Strongsville had a population of 43,858.

Warrensville Township
Warrensville Township was formed in 1814, several years after the first attempts at settlement.  The first permanent settler in Warrensville Township was Daniel Warren, formerly of New Hampshire, who came with his family in 1810, and after whom the township is named.  In 1822, members of the Shakers organized the North Union Shaker Community in the township in present-day Shaker Heights.  It endured until 1888, by which time the community had become too small to be viable.  Their land was eventually purchased in 1904 by developers who quickly arranged for the construction of subdivisions in the township.

The village of Beachwood was incorporated in Warrensville Township on June 26, 1915.  As the Cleveland metropolitan area expanded, parts of Warrensville Township were divided among Orange, Shaker Heights, University Heights, and Warrensville Heights. In 1990, Warrensville Township became a paper township when its last unincorporated area was incorporated as the village of Highland Hills. The township is now divided between Cleveland, Garfield Heights, Highland Hills, Orange, Shaker Heights, Beachwood, Warrensville Heights, North Randall, University Heights, and Cleveland Heights.

West Park Township
West Park Township was a small, short-lived township that was split from Rockport Township in 1900.  Historically, the area had been poor and underdeveloped, leading to its nickname of the "lost city".  The township lasted little more than 20 years, as it was annexed to the city of Cleveland in 1923.  Today, West Park comprises four westside neighborhoods of Cleveland: Jefferson, Kamm's Corners, Puritas-Longmead, and Hopkins (formerly called Riverside).

References

External links
Cuyahoga County website

Cuyahoga
Townships